Weiye Road is a metro station on Line 6 of the Hangzhou Metro in China. Opened on 30 December 2020, it is located in the Binjiang District of Hangzhou.

References 

Railway stations in Zhejiang
Railway stations in China opened in 2020
Hangzhou Metro stations